Rudolf Johann Schock (4 September 1915 – 13 November 1986) was a German tenor.

Rudolf Schock was born in Duisburg, in the Prussian Rhine Province. He sang a wide repertoire from operetta to Lohengrin, recording among others opera and lieder, doing television, radio and film work. Slim and handsome, he made many films.

His voice fell almost into the heldentenor fach but was smaller and more ardent than many voices in that category. Colored distinctly with a rich baritonal quality, Schock is described by Grove as a "lyric tenor" with a warm flexible voice, and a "strong top voice" which suited him to "heroic roles". However the same source feels that his acting left something to be desired.

When he was 18 and still continuing his musical studies that took him to Cologne, Hanover and Berlin, Schock joined the opera chorus at Theater Duisburg in the city of his birth. The Staatstheater Braunschweig cast Schock in solo roles in 1937, but his career was interrupted by his being enlisted into the army in 1940. It resumed after the war in 1945 in Hanover. In 1946, he appeared with two of the Berlin-based opera companies and in 1947 he joined the Hamburg State Opera where he was a member until 1956.

He was one of the first Germans to sing at Covent Garden in 1949. Appearing as Rodolfo, Alfredo, Pinkerton and Tamino in his first season. He sang the title role at Idomeneo at the Salzburg Festival and took part in the premiere there of Rolf Liebermann's, Penelope and the Vienna State Opera's first staging of Lulu. Schock made repeat visits to the Edinburgh International Festival and sang Walther at Bayreuth in 1959.

In 1953 he played and sang the role of Richard Tauber in the film  (released in English-speaking countries as either You Are the World for Me or The Richard Tauber Story). He was often compared to the older tenor and was spoken of as his successor. He was also considered the most successful German film singer of his generation.

He sold over three million records and his German films made him almost a superstar of his day. Schock's most impressive performances include the roles of Paul in Die Tote Stadt (Korngold), and multiple Puccini principals.

Schock was also interested in the development of younger singers by judging vocal competitions. After discovering Karl Ridderbusch at one of these, Schock part-funded the bass's musical training.

Rudolf Schock continued making concert appearances into his sixties. Aged 71, he died suddenly of a heart attack in Gürzenich a district of the town of Düren where he had made his home.

Selected filmography
 , as Richard Tauber
 The Happy Wanderer (1955), as Axel Wendt
 Ten on Every Finger (1954) as Himself
 The Csardas King (1958), as Janos
 Gräfin Mariza (1958), as Michael
 The House of Three Girls (1958), as Franz von Schober
As himself
Not Without Gisela (1951)
Big Request Concert (1960)

References

External links
 Rudolf Schock Website 
 History of the Tenor / Rudolf Schock / Sound Clips and Narration
 
 

1915 births
1986 deaths
People from Duisburg
People from the Rhine Province
German operatic tenors
Österreichischer Kammersänger
20th-century German male opera singers
German Army personnel of World War II
Commanders Crosses of the Order of Merit of the Federal Republic of Germany
Recipients of the National Prize of East Germany